Minutes to Go may refer to:

 Minutes To Go an album by Danish punk band Sods
 Minutes to Go (poetry), a Beat generation collaboration of Gregory Corso, Brion Gysin and William S. Burroughs